Southside Christian School is a private K-12 Christian school in Simpsonville, South Carolina. SCS was established in 1967 and is accredited by the Association of Christian Schools International. SCS serves approximately 1100 students beginning at 18 months of age and continuing through 12th grade on one campus. Students are divided into Early Education (EE2–EE5), Elementary School (1st–5th), Middle School (6th–8th), and High School (9th–12th).

History
Southside Christian School was one of five all-white private schools that were established in Greenville County between 1966 and 1970 when Greenville public schools were being desegregated. Southside Christian School officials, however, have denied that school was established to facilitate racially segregated education.

In 1978, Southside Christian School administrator Ron Brooks spoke at a conference organized by opponents of an IRS regulation that would revoke the tax exemptions of private schools that had significantly different racial composition than the surrounding community. Brooks said that it was "wrong for the government to get involved in our church" and claimed that the school did not "keep track of students by race". Brooks argued that since Southside Christian School was formed before the final court order desegregating Greenville schools, the school was not a discriminatory institution.

In 2002, Southside Christian School received inquiries from parents seeking to withdraw their children from public schools after a racially charged debate on school assignment zone changes.

The school's gymnasium was destroyed in a fire on November 20, 2002.

Sports

SCS is a 1A member of the South Carolina High School League, with boys and girls teams competing in 19 sports.
In 2009–2010, 2010–2011, and 2020, 2021, 2022 the Lady Sabre volleyball team won the Class A State Championship.
In 2015, 2020, and 2021, the varsity football team won the Class A State Championship.

Boys

Girls

References

External links 
 https://www.southsidechristian.org/

1967 establishments in South Carolina
Christian schools in South Carolina
Educational institutions established in 1967
Private high schools in South Carolina
Private middle schools in South Carolina
Private elementary schools in South Carolina
Schools in Greenville County, South Carolina